"Sweet Lies" is the debut single by British singer Ellie Campbell. The song was released in March 1999 and peaked at number 43 on the UK Singles Chart.

Track listing
UK single (0519222)
 "Sweet Lies" - 3:52
 "The Things You Do" - 4:25
 "Sweet Lies"  (Slow, WIP and Grind Mix)  - 5:04

Charts

References

1999 debut singles
1999 songs
Songs written by Karl Twigg
Songs written by Mark Topham
Songs written by Lance Ellington
Jive Records singles
Dance-pop songs